Si Mahosot is a district (amphoe) of Prachinburi province, eastern Thailand. It may also be spelled Sri Mahosot.

Geography
Neighboring districts are (from the west clockwise): Ban Sang, Mueang Prachinburi and Si Maha Phot of Prachinburi Province; and Phanom Sarakham of Chachoengsao province.

History
The minor district (king amphoe) Khok Pip was established on 15 February 1970, when the three tambons, Khok Pip, Khu Lam Phan, and Phai Cha Lueat were split off from Si Maha Phot district. It was upgraded to a full district on 13 April 1977, and renamed Si Mahosot on 3 June 1993.

Administration
The district is divided into four sub-districts (tambons), which are further subdivided into 24 villages (mubans). Khok Pip is a township (thesaban tambon) which covers parts of tambon Khok Pip. There are a further three tambon administrative organizations (TAO).

References

External links
amphoe.com

Si Mahosot